Chelsea Yacht and Boat Company v Pope [2001] 2 All ER 409 is an English legal case. The case established that a houseboat cannot form part of the land (real property) as the degree of annexation is insufficient. Secondly the court held that as a result a rented houseboat to an occupier is not a dwelling house, under Part One of the Housing Act 1988 and is a chattel of its owner.  The licence to occupy can be revoked, whether instantly or on reasonable notice, rather than under the more lengthy possession proceedings of the law of residential tenancies.

The court applied the test of the most senior court in Elitestone Limited v Morris [1997] which found positively in favour of a chalet being annexed as part of the land.

Facts
Pope rented since 1993 a houseboat where he lived north of Battersea Bridge on the left bank, aground for half of the time due to its position and the tide (on the Tideway). The owner brought possession proceedings under the Housing Act 1998; the preliminary legal question was whether this was the correct procedure as if it were not a "dwelling" it would instead be a "chattel" so possession could be more quickly got back by the landlord.

Decision
The case established that a houseboat does not form part of the land which is not in common ownership (such as through adverse possession of the river bed) as the degree of annexation is insufficient. 

Tuckey LJ gave the lead judgment:

Waller LJ agreed giving no opinion.

Morritt LJ gave his own concurring opinion.

As the three judges agreed, Chelsea Yacht and Boat Club could recover their asset as a licence to occupy which expired, not waiting among other things for 28 days to pass from falling into arrears, nor did the law require a notice to be served.  No notice to quit "was strictly required".

See also
English land law
English property law

References

English property case law
2001 in England
2001 in case law
English land case law
2001 in British law